Thomas Mahoney may refer to:
Thomas Mahoney (architect) (1855–1923), New Zealand architect
Thomas H. D. Mahoney (1913–1997), American professor and politician